Phytometra zotica is a species of moth of the family Erebidae. It is found in Madagascar.

References

Boletobiinae